W, Here is the debut extended play by NU'EST W, a subgroup of the South Korean boy band NU'EST. It was released on October 10, 2017, by Pledis Entertainment. The EP features six tracks in total including the lead single "Where You At".

Background and release 
On September 14, 2017, Pledis Entertainment announced that JR, Aron, Baekho and Ren would debut as NU'EST W with an extended play titled W, Here on October 10. On October 8 and 9, individual teasers for the music video of the title track "Where You At" were revealed. The EP and the music video for "Where You At" were released on October 10.

Track listing

Charts

Weekly charts

Monthly charts

Accolades

Music programs awards

References

External links 
 "Where You At" music video on YouTube

NU'EST albums
Korean-language albums
2017 albums
Hybe Corporation EPs